The following is a list of notable deaths in January 2007.

Entries for each day are listed alphabetically by surname. A typical entry lists information in the following sequence:
 Name, age, country of citizenship at birth, subsequent country of citizenship (if applicable), reason for notability, cause of death (if known), and reference.

January 2007

1
A. I. Bezzerides, 98, Turkish-American novelist and screenwriter, injuries from a fall.
Leonard Fraser, 55, Australian serial killer, heart attack.
Julius Hegyi, 83, American conductor, Alzheimer's disease.
Tad Jones, 54, American jazz music historian, complications from a fall.
Ernie Koy, 97, American baseball player, in his sleep.
Roland Levinsky, 63, South African medical scientist, Plymouth University Vice Chancellor, electric shock induced heart attack.
Tillie Olsen, 94, American writer, natural causes.
Del Reeves, 74, American country singer, emphysema.
Eleonore Schoenfeld, 81, Slovenian-born cellist and teacher at USC Thornton School of Music, heart attack.
Darrent Williams, 24, American NFL player (Denver Broncos), drive-by shooting.

2
Garry Betty, 49, American CEO of Earthlink, adrenocortical carcinoma.
Sir Eric Denton, 77, British marine biologist.
Elizabeth Fox-Genovese, 65, American historian, complications from surgery.
Sergio Jiménez, 69, Mexican actor, heart attack.
Mauno Jokipii, 82, Finnish professor and World War II researcher, complications after hip replacement surgery.
Teddy Kollek, 95, Israeli Mayor of Jerusalem (1965–1993), natural causes.
Don Massengale, 69, American PGA Tour golf player, heart attack.
A. Richard Newton, 55, Australian-born technology pioneer and professor at University of California, Berkeley, pancreatic cancer.
Paek Nam-sun, 78, North Korean Foreign minister.
David Perkins, 87, American Stanford University geneticist, after short illness.
Dan Shaver, 56, American NASCAR driver and ARCA race car driver/owner, cancer.
Robert C. Solomon, 64, American scholar of continental philosophy.

3
Annibale Ciarniello, 106, Italian World War I veteran.
János Fürst, 71, Hungarian-born orchestral conductor, cancer.
William Jencks, 79, American biochemist.
Jim Mooney, 83, Australian politician, member of the Tasmanian House of Assembly (1976–1979).
Earl Reibel, 76, Canadian ice hockey forward (Detroit Red Wings), 1956 Lady Byng Trophy winner, complications of stroke.
Calvin William Verity Jr., 89, United States Secretary of Commerce (1987–1989), complications from pneumonia.
Sir Cecil Walker, 82, British Ulster Unionist MP for North Belfast (1983–2001), heart attack.
Michael Yeats, 85, Irish Fianna Fáil senator (1961–1981) and son of W. B. Yeats.

4
Léo Tarcísio Gonçalves Pereira , 45, Brazilian Roman Catholic priest and Founder of the "Bethânia" Community (1995–2007), lymphoma.
Juma Akukweti, 59, Tanzanian MP for Chama Cha Mapinduzi (1990–2007), injuries from plane crash.
Ben Gannon, 54, Australian theatre, film and television producer, cancer.
Christopher Greenbury, 55, American film editor (American Beauty, There's Something About Mary, Daddy Day Care).
Helen Hill, 36, American independent film-maker, shot.
Sir Lewis Hodges, 88, British Air Chief Marshal.
Gren, 72, British newspaper cartoonist.
Steve Krantz, 83, American film and TV producer (Fritz the Cat), husband of Judith Krantz, complications of pneumonia.
Bob Milliken, 80, American Brooklyn Dodgers pitcher (1953–1954), cardiac arrest.
Gáspár Nagy, 57, Hungarian poet and writer.
Sandro Salvadore, 67, Italian footballer, heart attack.
Jan Schröder, 65, Dutch cyclist.
Marais Viljoen, 91, South African president (1979–1984), heart failure.

5
Momofuku Ando, 96, Taiwanese-born inventor of Nissin instant ramen noodles including the Cup Noodle, heart failure.
E. J. Hughes, 93, Canadian painter, heart failure.
Chih Ree Sun, 83, Chinese-American physicist and poet, kidney and lung cancer.
Francis Sullivan, 89, Canadian Olympic gold medal-winning (1952) ice hockey player.

6
Bill W. Clayton, 78, American Speaker of the Texas House of Representatives (1975–1983), natural causes.
Mario Danelo, 21, American football placekicker for University of Southern California, fall from a cliff.
Yvon Durelle, 77, Canadian boxing champion, complications from a stroke.
Frédéric Etsou-Nzabi-Bamungwabi, 76, Congolese Cardinal Archbishop of Kinshasa, complications of diabetes.
Antonella Kerr, Marchioness of Lothian, 84, British journalist and broadcaster.
Charmion King, 81, Canadian actress.
Sneaky Pete Kleinow, 72, American special effects artist and pedal steel guitarist (Flying Burrito Brothers), Alzheimer's disease.
Suad Nasr, 53, Egyptian actress, complications from liposuction.
Annelies Reinhold, 90, Austrian actress.
Mohamed Lamine Sanha, Bissau-Guinean Navy Chief of Staff, shot.
Ira D. Wallach, 97, American philanthropist and CEO of Central National-Gottesman (1956–1979).
Roberta Wohlstetter, 94, American historian of military intelligence.

7
Bobby Hamilton, 49, American NASCAR driver, 2004 Craftsman Truck Series Champion, head and neck cancer.
Magnus Magnusson, 77, Icelandic television presenter (Mastermind, 1972–1997), pancreatic cancer.
Ernesto Martínez, 55, Cuban Olympic bronze medal-winning volleyball player (1972, 1976, 1980).
Olli-Matti Multamäki, 58, Finnish commander of the Finnish Army, illness.
Lou Palazzi, 85, American football player and umpire.
Hotte Paksha Rangaswamy, 74, Indian politician, Guinness World Record-holder for contesting elections, brief illness.

8
Jane Bolin, 98, American New York City family court judge (1939–1979) and first African American female judge.
Arthur Cockfield, Baron Cockfield, 90, British proponent of the European single market and Vice President of the European Commission (1985-1989).
Ken Cranston, 89, English test cricketer (1947–1948).
Yvonne De Carlo, 84, Canadian-born American actress (The Ten Commandments, The Munsters, McLintock!).
David Ervine, 53, Northern Irish leader of the Progressive Unionist Party, complications from heart attack and stroke.
Peter Flanagan, 65, British rugby league player for Great Britain and Hull KR.
Han Bong-soo, 75, Korean martial arts master and film fight choreographer.
Drew Posada, 37, American comic book colourist and artist, pancreatitis.
José Quaglio, 80, Italian actor and theatre director.
Italo Sarrocco, 108, Italian World War I veteran.
Iwao Takamoto, 81, Japanese American animator, TV producer and film director, created Scooby-Doo, heart failure.
Judith Vladeck, 83, American labor lawyer and women's rights advocate, complications of infection.

9
Cocoa Samoa, professional wrestler, 61.
Dame Joyanne Bracewell, 72, British senior judge of the Family Division of the High Court, breast cancer.
Ion Dincă, 78, Romanian Deputy Prime Minister and Mayor of Bucharest during the Communist era.
Maureen Orcutt, 99, American golf champion.
Yelena Petushkova, 66, Russian equestrian, double medallist at the 1972 Olympics, after long illness.
Elmer Symons, 29, South African off-road motorcycle racer, accident during the Dakar Rally.
Jean-Pierre Vernant, 93, French historian and anthropologist.

10
Harry Baxter, 85, British soldier.
Ray Beck, 75, American football player for the New York Giants (1952–1957).
Harry Horse, 46, British cartoonist and children's book author (The Last... series), suicide.
Carlo Ponti, 94, Italian film producer, pulmonary complications.
Sixto Rojas, 25, Paraguayan footballer.
Bradford Washburn, 96, American cartographer, mountaineer and founder of the Boston Museum of Science, heart failure.

11
Solveig Dommartin, 45, French actress, trapeze artist in Wim Wenders' Wings of Desire, heart attack.
Bob MacQuarrie, 80, Canadian politician (1981–1985).
Kéba Mbaye, 82, Senegalese judge, vice president of the International Court of Justice and vice president of the International Olympic Committee.
Dale Noyd, 73, American Air Force captain and Vietnam War conscientious objector, emphysema.
Donald Edward Osterbrock, 82, American astronomer, heart attack.
Bryan Pearce, 77, British painter.
Robert Anton Wilson, 74, American novelist, futurist and conspiracy theory researcher, post-polio syndrome.

12
Jimmy Cheatham, 82, American jazz trombonist.
Alice Coltrane, 69, American jazz musician and widow of John Coltrane, respiratory failure.
Stephen Gilbert, 96, British painter and sculptor.
Sir James Killen, 81, Australian Minister for Defence (1975–1982).
Terrance B. Lettsome, 71, British Virgin Islands politician, illness.
Olivier Prechac, 58, French Olympic ice hockey player 
Larry Stewart, 58, American philanthropist known in Kansas City as "Secret Santa", esophageal cancer.
Adolfas Varanauskas, 72, Lithuanian Olympic athlete.

13
Michael Brecker, 57, American jazz saxophonist, leukemia.
Chalky, 17, British Jack Russell terrier, celebrity pet of Rick Stein.
Cho Tat-wah, 91, Hong Kong wuxia actor, stomach hemorrhage.
Doyle Holly, 70, American bassist for Buck Owens' Buckaroos (1963–1971), prostate cancer.
Henri-Jean Martin, 82, French librarian and book historian, cancer.
Danny Oakes, 95, American USAC champion midget car driver.
Augustin Diamacoune Senghor, 78, Senegalese separatist leader.

14
Gido Babilonia, 40, Filipino basketball player, pulmonary embolism.
Darlene Conley, 72, American actress (The Bold and the Beautiful), stomach cancer.
Tudor Gates, 76, British playwright and trade unionist.
John Hawkins, 62, Canadian composer.
Beate Hermelin, 87, German psychologist.
Barbara Kelly, 82, Canadian-born British actress (What's My Line), cancer.
Robert Noortman, 60, Dutch art dealer, heart attack.
Vassilis Photopoulos, 72, Greek Academy Award-winning art director (Zorba the Greek).
Peter Prendergast, 60, Welsh artist.

15
Awad Hamed al-Bandar, 61, Iraqi former chief judge, execution by hanging.
Barzan Ibrahim al-Tikriti, 55, Iraqi former leader of the Iraqi Intelligence Service, half-brother of Saddam Hussein, execution by hanging.
Leonard Berg, 79, American neurologist, creator of the Clinical Dementia Rating scale, stroke.
Bo Yibo, 98, Chinese politician known for urging crackdown on Tiananmen Square protests of 1989.
Sir John Boynton, 88, British local government official.
Colette Caillat, 86, French Sanskrit scholar.
Isaac Fanous, 87, Egyptian artist and scholar who specialized in Coptic art.
James Hillier, 91, Canadian-born American inventor of first practical electron microscope.
Ardeshir Hosseinpour, 44, Iranian nuclear physicist.
Bruce Kenrick, 86, British social activist and clergyman.
Aart Koopmans, 60, Dutch founder of the Alternative Elfstedentocht speed skating series, pneumonia.
Richard Musgrave, 96, German-born Harvard economist and government adviser, natural causes.
Percy Saltzman, 91, Canadian meteorologist and television personality, first person to appear on Canadian CBLT Toronto television.
Colin Thurston, 59, British record producer (Duran Duran, Magazine, The Human League, Kajagoogoo).

16
Ron Carey, 71, American actor (Barney Miller, History of the World, Part I), stroke.
Rudolf August Oetker, 90, German food industry magnate (Oetker Group) and philanthropist.
Benny Parsons, 65, American champion NASCAR driver, won 1973 Winston Cup, complications from lung cancer.
René Riffaud, 108, one of France's last surviving World War I veterans.
Jainal Antel Sali, Jr., 42, Filipino terrorist and a commander of Abu Sayyaf, shot in an army raid.
Yuri Stern, 57, Israeli politician, cancer.
Betty Trezza, 82, American baseball player in the All-American Girls Professional Baseball League, heart attack.
Gisela Uhlen, 87, German actress.
David Vanole, 43, American soccer goalkeeper, heart condition.

17
Ülle Aaskivi, 56, Estonian politician.
Alice Auma, 50, Ugandan rebel leader and founder of the Holy Spirit Movement.
Art Buchwald, 81, American humorist and columnist, kidney failure.
Ralph Henstock, 83, British mathematician.
Yevhen Kushnaryov, 55, Ukrainian politician and a deputy leader of the Party of Regions, shot while hunting.
Virtue Hampton Whitted, 84, American jazz musician, member of The Hampton Sisters, stroke.

18
Cyril Baselios, 71, Indian Major Archbishop of the Syro-Malankara Catholic Church, heart attack.
Brent Liles, 43, American bassist (Social Distortion, Agent Orange), traffic accident.
Charles H. O'Brien, 86, American judge, Tennessee Supreme Court (1987–1994).
Bonaventure Patrick Paul, 77, Pakistani Roman Catholic Bishop of Hyderabad.

19
Murat Nasyrov, 37, Russian pop singer of Uyghur ethnicity, committed suicide by jumping from a balcony. The postmortem examination of his body did not reveal any traces of alcohol or drugs.
Bam Bam Bigelow, 45, American professional wrestler, drug overdose.
Fiama Hasse Pais Brandão, 69, Portuguese poet, dramatist, essayist and translator, long illness.
Gerhard Bronner, 84, Austrian composer and cabaret artist, complications following a stroke.
Hrant Dink, 52, Armenian-Turkish editor, journalist and columnist, shot.
Denny Doherty, 66, Canadian singer, abdominal aneurysm.
Bill Lefebvre, 91, American baseball pitcher for Boston Red Sox (1938–1939) and Washington Senators (1943–1944).

20
Éric Aubijoux, 42, French motorcycle rider, possible cardiac arrest during Dakar Rally.
Charles Blakey Blackmar, 84, American jurist (Supreme Court of Missouri).
Dan Christensen, 64, American abstract painter, heart failure due to polymyositis.
Lloyd Francis, 86, Canadian MP and Speaker of the Canadian House of Commons (1984), stomach cancer.
Christopher Helm, 69, British publisher and ornithologist.
Sir David Mostyn, 78, British Army general, Adjutant-General to the Forces (1986–1988).
Murat Nasyrov, 37, Russian-Kazakh singer, suicide by jumping.
Anatol Rapoport, 95, Russian-born American mathematical psychologist and peace activist.
Alfredo Ripstein, 90, Mexican movie producer, respiratory failure.
Vern Ruhle, 55, American Major League Baseball pitcher and pitching coach, multiple myeloma.
George Smathers, 93, American politician, United States Senator (D-FL; 1951–1969), stroke complications.
Alida de Vries, 92, Dutch women's 4 × 100 m relay runner at the 1936 Summer Olympics.

21
Maria Cioncan, 29, Romanian runner and medalist at 2004 Summer Olympics, car accident.
Peter Clarke, 58, British Children's Commissioner for Wales, cancer.
Richard Ollard, 83, British historian and biographer.
Peer Raben, 66, German composer, mainly of film music associated with Rainer Werner Fassbinder.
Barbara Seranella, 50, American author, liver failure.
U;Nee, 25, Korean pop singer, suicide by hanging.

22
John Arthur, 60, American philosopher, lung cancer.
Doug Blasdell, 44, American Bravo television network trainer on Work Out.
L. M. Boyd, 79, American newspaper columnist for the San Francisco Chronicle.
Toulo de Graffenried, 92, Swiss Formula One racing driver (1950–1956).
Victoria Hopper, 97, British stage and film actress.
Ramón Marsal, 72, Spanish footballer for Real Madrid.
Michael Nolan, Baron Nolan, 78, English Law Lord and first chairman of the Committee on Standards in Public Life, degenerative illness.
Elizaphan Ntakirutimana, 83, Rwandan pastor convicted of participation in the Rwandan genocide.
Abbé Pierre, 94, French founder of the Emmaüs movement, lung infection.

23
Syed Hussein Alatas, 78, Malaysian academic, writer and Gerakan Party founding president, heart attack.
Disco D, 26, American hip hop producer, suicide.
E. Howard Hunt, 88, American Watergate scandal principal, pneumonia.
Dick Joyce, 63, American baseball player.
Ryszard Kapuściński, 74, Polish journalist, author of book about The Soccer War.
John Majhor, 53, Canadian and American radio and TV broadcaster, cancer.
Leopoldo Pirelli, 81, Italian chairman of Pirelli (1965–1996).
Wally Ridley, 93, English record producer and songwriter.
David M. Ronne, 63, American sound engineer.

24
İsmail Cem, 66, Turkish politician, Minister of Foreign Affairs (1997–2002), lung cancer.
Jean-François Deniau, 78, French writer and statesman, member of the Académie française.
Krystyna Feldman, 90, Polish actress, lung cancer.
Wolfgang Iser, 80, German literary scholar and founder of Reader-response criticism.
Bryan Kocis, 44, American gay pornography producer, stabbed.
Guadalupe Larriva, 50, Ecuadorian Defense Minister, helicopter crash.
John W. Lavelle, 57, American Member of the New York State Assembly, stroke.
A. H. de Oliveira Marques, 73, Portuguese historian, heart failure.
Emiliano Mercado del Toro, 115, Puerto Rican WW I veteran, was world's oldest person, natural causes.
David Morris, 79, British Labour MEP (1984–99) and Chairman of CND Cymru.
Charlotte Thompson Reid, 93, American singer and Republican member of the U.S. House of Representatives.
Mendy Samstein, 68, American civil rights activist, organizer for the Student Nonviolent Coordinating Committee, carcinoid cancer.
Daniel Stern, 79, American University of Houston professor, Warner Bros. and CBS Vice President, heart surgery complications.
Peter Tompkins, 87, American journalist and writer (The Secret Life of Plants).

25
Ken Kavanaugh, 90, American National Football League player, complications from pneumonia.
Majid Khadduri, 98, Iraqi–born American founder of the SAIS Middle East Studies program, failure to thrive.
Jack Lang, 85, American sportswriter and secretary-treasurer of the Baseball Writers Association (1966–1988).
Eleanor McGovern, 85, American wife of Senator and Presidential candidate George McGovern.
Hideo Ogata, 73, Japanese founding editor of Animage, stomach cancer.
Roberta Semple Salter, 96, American evangelist, daughter of Aimee Semple McPherson and co-creator of Name That Tune.

26
Charles Brunier, 105, French veteran of WWI and WWII who claimed to have been the inspiration for Papillon.
Avis M. Dry, 85, British-born clinical psychologist and author on work of Carl Jung.
Sharon Tyler Herbst, 64, American author of The Food Lover's Companion cookbook, ovarian cancer.
Jean Ichbiah, 66, French computer scientist and chief designer of the Ada programming language, brain cancer.
Max Kelly, 76, Australian mathematics professor and leading researcher into category theory.
Jimmy Ledgard, 84, British rugby league player for Great Britain, Dewsbury and Leigh.
Emanuele Luzzati, 85, Italian painter, Oscar-nominated production designer and animator.
David Rattray, 48, South African historian of the Anglo-Zulu War, shot.
Glen Tetley, 80, American choreographer and dancer, melanoma.
Iwuchukwu Amara Tochi, 21, Nigerian convicted of drug trafficking in Singapore, execution by hanging.
Philip J. Thomas, 92, Canadian folklorist.
Hans Wegner, 92, Danish furniture designer.
Gump Worsley, 77, Canadian NHL goaltender and Vezina Trophy winner, heart attack.

27
Trevor Allan, 80, Australian rugby union player and TV commentator, cancer.
Tige Andrews, 86, American actor (The Mod Squad), cardiac arrest.
Marcheline Bertrand, 56, American actress, cancer.
Bob Carroll Jr., 88, American television writer for I Love Lucy.
Paul Channon, 71, British MP for Southend West (1959–1997) and government minister.
Bing Devine, 90, American general manager of the National League's St. Louis Cardinals baseball team (1958–1964, 1968–1978).
Claudio Guillén, 82, Spanish writer, member of the Royal Spanish Academy and son of Jorge Guillén, heart attack.
Kamleshwar, 75, Indian writer and television executive, heart attack.
Philippe Lacoue-Labarthe, 66, French professor of aesthetics at University of Strasbourg, respiratory insufficiency. 
Herbert Reinecker, 92, German novelist, dramatist and screenwriter (Derrick).
Yang Chuan-kwang, 73, Taiwanese silver medalist in decathlon at 1960 Summer Olympics, brain hemorrhage.

28
Ivan Boszormenyi-Nagy, 86, Hungarian-American psychiatrist, complications from Parkinson's disease.
Malcolm Bowie, 63, English scholar of French literature and Master of Christ's College, Cambridge (2002–2006).
Carlo Clerici, 78, Swiss road racing cyclist who won 1954 Giro d'Italia, cancer.
Cyril Demarne, 101, British wartime firefighter.
Robert Drinan, 86, American Democratic Representative and law professor, pneumonia/congestive heart failure.
Beatrice Hsu, 28, Taiwanese actress, cardiac arrest following car accident.
Fiona Jones, 49, British politician, Labour MP for Newark (1997–2001), alcoholic liver disease
Alf Large, 88, Norwegian Olympic bobsledder.
O. P. Nayyar, 81, Indian music director for Bollywood films, cardiac arrest.
Deborah Orin, 59, American bureau chief in Washington for the New York Post, cancer.
Yelena Romanova, 43, Russian track and field athlete, 3000 metres gold medalist at 1992 Summer Olympics.
Karel Svoboda, 68, Czech composer, suicide.
Emma Tillman, 114, American who was the recognised world's oldest person.
Johnny Williams, 80, British champion professional boxer in the 1940s and 50s.

29
Barbaro, 4, American racehorse, 2006 Kentucky Derby winner, euthanized after contracting laminitis.
José D'Elía, 90, Uruguayan labor leader and politician.
Art Fowler, 84, American Major League Baseball pitcher and pitching coach.
Robert Meier, 109, German oldest living man, World War I veteran.
Dick Wingfield-Digby, 95, British Anglican priest, Dean of Peterborough (1966–1980).

30
Sir Stephen Berthon, 84, British admiral, cancer.
Stu Inman, 80, American National Basketball Association executive, heart attack.
Griffith Jones, 97, British actor.
Nikos Kourkoulos, 72, Greek actor and artistic director of the National Theatre of Greece, cancer.
Max Lanier, 91, American baseball player.
Gordon Macklin, 78, American stock broker, NASD President (1970–1987), oversaw NASDAQ start, stroke.
John Matsudaira, 84, American painter.
Calvin Plimpton, 89, American president of Amherst College (1960–1971), complications from surgery.
Sidney Sheldon, 89, American author and TV producer (I Dream of Jeannie), complications from pneumonia.

31
Kirill Babitzin, 56, Finnish singer, 9th in 1984 Eurovision Song Contest.
Lee Bergere, 88, American actor (Dynasty).
Molly Ivins, 62, American newspaper columnist, political commentator and author, breast cancer.
Mohammed Jamal Khalifa, 49, Saudi brother-in-law of Osama bin Laden, shot.
Olevi Kull, 51, Estonian ecologist.
Arben Minga, 47, Albanian football player, pancreatic cancer.
Ronald Muldrow, 57, American jazz guitarist.
Douglas T. Ross, 77, American who created APT (programming language) and led MIT CAD project.
Hokishe Sema, 85, Indian politician, Chief Minister of Nagaland.
Adelaide Tambo, 77, South African activist and wife of Oliver Tambo.

References

2007-01
 01